Indira Gandhi Co-operative Hospital (IGCH), formerly known as the Cochin Co-operative Hospital, is a hospital operating in the co-operative sector in Kochi, Kerala, India.

See also 
 Government Medical College, Ernakulam

References 

Hospitals in Kochi
Cooperatives in Kerala
Monuments and memorials to Indira Gandhi
Year of establishment missing